Milanko Renovica (Serbian Cyrillic: Mилaнкo Peнoвицa; 19 October 1928 – 2 November 2013) was a Bosnian and former Yugoslav politician. He was the President of the League of Communists of Yugoslavia. He also served as President of the Presidency of Bosnia and Herzegovina and as the President of the Executive Council of Bosnia and Herzegovina.

Renovica lived in Bosnia and Herzegovina. He died on 2 November 2013 in Prague, Czech Republic, aged 85.

References

1928 births
2013 deaths
People from Sokolac
League of Communists of Bosnia and Herzegovina politicians
Central Committee of the League of Communists of Yugoslavia members
Chairmen of the Presidency of Bosnia and Herzegovina
Prime Ministers of Bosnia and Herzegovina